Ortholasma pictipes is a species of harvestman in the family Nemastomatidae. It is found in North America.

References

Harvestmen
Articles created by Qbugbot
Animals described in 1911
Taxa named by Nathan Banks